The American rock band Brand New has recorded songs for five studio albums, as well as numerous extended plays and demos. This list comprises the band's song catalog, as well as live renditions, early demo tracks, recorded appearances on other albums, and unreleased tracks that have been discussed by the band. Brand New formed in Long Island, a suburb of New York City in 2000. The group consists of vocalist and guitarist Jesse Lacey, guitarist Vincent Accardi, drummer Brian Lane, and bassist Garrett Tierney. Previous member Derrick Sherman also contributed guitar to a number of the band's releases, whilst producer Mike Sapone has worked with the band throughout their career, and is considered by the band to be a fifth or sixth member.

Songs

See also
Brand New discography

References

External links
Official website

Brand new